Oaktree Capital Management  is an American global asset management firm specializing in alternative investment strategies. As of March 31, 2022, the company managed $164 billion for its clientele.

The firm was co-founded in 1995 by a group that had formerly worked together at the TCW Group starting in the 1980s. On March 13, 2019, Canada's  Brookfield Asset Management announced that it had agreed to buy 62% of Oaktree Capital Management for approximately $4.7 billion.

Firm overview
The firm is based in Los Angeles, and has over 1,000 employees in offices in 19 cities worldwide (Los Angeles; London; New York City; Hong Kong; Stamford, Connecticut, Tokyo, Luxembourg, Paris, Frankfurt, Singapore, Seoul, Beijing; Amsterdam; Dubai; Houston, Helsinki, Dublin, Shanghai and Sydney). The company's co-chairman, Howard Marks, is known in the investment community for his letters to investors.

Since its formation in 1995, Oaktree has become the largest distressed-debt investor in the world. In 2008, it raised $10.9 billion for what was the largest-ever distressed debt fund, its Opportunities Fund VIIb. As reported in The Washington Post on June 26, 2011, Oaktree's 17 distressed-debt funds (which do not use leverage) have averaged annual gains of 19% after fees for the past 22 years.

Investor base
Oaktree's clientele includes 67 of the 100 largest U.S. pension plans, 40 state retirement plans in the United States, over 400 corporations and/or their pension funds, over 300 university, charitable and other endowments and foundations, and 15 sovereign wealth funds. According to The Wall Street Journal, Oaktree has “long been considered a stable repository for pension-fund and endowment money.”

The company's distressed-debt funds are often over-subscribed, and in 2010 Oaktree turned down potential investors due to self-imposed limits on fund size.

History

Early years (1995–1999)
Oaktree was founded in 1995 by a group of principals who first joined together at the TCW Group in the mid-1980s Within three months of its founding in 1995, “more than 30 TCW clients transferred $1.5 billion in assets to Oaktree.”

Oaktree has formed various sub-advisory relationships since 1995. In 1996, Oaktree was selected as the sub-advisor for the Vanguard Convertible Securities Fund.

Since 1995, Oaktree has created what it refers to as “step-out” strategies, usually coincident with the opening of new offices around the world.  Its growth in strategies has largely focused on expanding into European and Asian markets. Between 1997 and 1999, Oaktree created 3 new strategies: Emerging Markets Absolute Return in 1997, European High Yield Bonds in 1999, and Power Opportunities in 1999.

2000–2010
In 2001 Oaktree continued to introduce new "step-out" strategies, starting with Mezzanine Finance. Asia Principal Opportunities (2006) followed, along with European Principal Investments (2006), European Senior Loans (2006), U.S. Senior Loans and Value Opportunities (2007), Global High Yield Bonds (2010), Emerging Markets Equities (2011), and Real Estate Debt (2012).

In 2005 the Securities And Exchange Commission ordered Oaktree to pay a fine, interest, and disgorge profits after the SEC ruled they had "sold securities short" before the five legal business days after a public offering pricing had gone public. Oaktree was required to put in place policies and procedures to prevent violations in the future.

In 2008, the firm raised $11 billion for their distressed debt fund. In 2009, Oaktree was selected by the U.S. Treasury, along with eight other managers (BlackRock, Invesco, AllianceBernstein and others) to participate in the government's Public-Private Investment Program (PPIP).  At the time of Oaktree's inclusion in the PPIP program, The New York Times reported: “Howard S. Marks is the sort of financier who Washington hopes will help fix the nation’s tumbledown banks.”  As of December 31, 2018, the Oaktree PPIP Fund, L.P. had a gross return of 28%.

2010–2020
In 2009, Oaktree acquired a 20% stake in DoubleLine Capital, a Los Angeles-based investment firm specializing in mortgage-backed fixed income portfolios.

The firm's relationship with Vanguard was expanded in 2011 when Oaktree was selected as one of four firms to manage Vanguard's Emerging Markets Select Stock Fund.  In 2010, Oaktree was named one of three advisors to the Russell Global Opportunistic Credit Fund and was selected as a manager for the Credit Suisse (Lux) I Fund in 2011.

Seeking investment opportunities created by the European sovereign-debt crisis, Oaktree started its European Principal Fund III in November 2011 with committed capital of some €3 billion.

In 2017, Eaton Vance launched the Oaktree Diversified Credit NextShares exchange-traded managed fund with Oaktree as subadvisor.

In 2018, Oaktree filed a registration statement to launch a non-traded REIT.

Other recent funds

According to the company's published financial results, Oaktree raised $12 billion for Oaktree Opportunities Funds X and Xb (“Opps X and Xb”).

NYSE listing

On April 12, 2012, Oaktree became a publicly traded partnership with shares listed on the NYSE. The company was previously listed on GSTrUE, a private over-the-counter exchange run by Goldman Sachs which officially ceased operations in 2012 after Oaktree, along with Apollo Global Management (in 2011), de-listed and moved to the NYSE.

Acquisition of Control by Brookfield

On March 13, 2019, Brookfield Asset Management announced that it had agreed to buy 62% of Oaktree Capital Management for about $4.7 billion, creating one of the world’s largest alternative money managers. On September 30, 2019, completion of the acquisition of a majority stake by Brookfield Asset Management was announced.

Investment funds
Oaktree's current investment activities are divided across four asset classes: credit, private equity, real assets and listed equities.

Select past and current investments
 Aleris International — acquired 1 May 2010
 Almatis Group — acquired 2010
 Billabong - Australia's largest surfwear company.  
 Campofrío Food Group — (24%) European food industry. Sold in 2013.
 Conbipel — (100%) Italian fashion industry
 Environmental 360 Solutions — Canadian Environmental Management company
 Fitness First - Global health club chain. Taken over in partnership with Marathon Asset Management in 2012. Parts of business subsequently sold in whole or in part in 2016-17.
Loews Cineplex Entertainment — jointly acquired by Onex Corporation from Sony Pictures and Universal Studios in 2002. U.S. division was sold in 2004 to The Carlyle Group (in turn merged with AMC Theatres in 2006); Canadian subsidiary merged with Galaxy Entertainment to form Cineplex Galaxy, renamed to Cineplex Entertainment in 2005.  
Marlin Brands
MediaWorks New Zealand — acquired a controlling 77.8% share in the business, after recently purchasing shares from RBS and Westpac; acquisition completed April 29, 2015.
Nine Entertainment — taken over (alongside Apollo Global Management and Goldman Sachs) from CVC Asia Pacific in a refinancing deal in Oct 2012, sold final stake in 2017.
 Quiksilver — American retail sporting company
 Sky Holding — jet airplane ownership
 SM Caen, Ligue 2 football club in France. Currently hold 80% of the club's shares - acquisition completed in September 2020.
Tribune Company — acquired jointly with JPMorgan Chase and Angelo Gordon; acquisition completed July 2012.
 Verreries de l’Orne à Ecouché (Orne) — glass etching firm — 1 April 2010
Zzoomm, UK-based telecommunications company. Majority stake acquired for £100 million in September 2020.

See also
 :Category:Oaktree Capital Management

References

Further reading
2011: The Most Important Thing: Uncommon Sense for the Thoughtful Investor by Howard Marks (Columbia University Press)
2018: Mastering the Market Cycle: Getting the Odds on Your Side by Howard Marks (Mariner Books)

External links

Financial year 2014 accounting statements

 
Companies listed on the New York Stock Exchange
Financial services companies established in 1995
Hedge fund firms in California
Private equity firms of the United States
2019 mergers and acquisitions
Companies based in Los Angeles
2012 initial public offerings
Brookfield Asset Management